The Felvidék football team is a team representing the Hungarian minority in Southern Slovakia. Felvidék is the Hungarian word for “highlands” and the region usually referred to as Felvidék makes up nearly 10% of the territory of modern Slovakia. It is a member of ConIFA, an umbrella association for states, minorities, stateless peoples and regions unaffiliated with FIFA.

The team participated in the 2015 ConIFA European Football Cup and 2017 ConIFA European Football Cup  finishing 4th and 7th overall respectively.

Felvidéki Labdarúgó Egyesület

The Felvidéki Labdarúgó Egyesület is the football association of Felvidék.

See also
	 
 Délvidék football team 
 Kárpátalja football team
 Székely Land football team

References 

CONIFA member associations
European national and official selection-teams not affiliated to FIFA
Felvidék national football team
Hungarians in Slovakia